The Under-Secretary of State for Commonwealth Relations was a junior ministerial post in the United Kingdom Government from 1947 until 1966. The holder was responsible for assisting the Secretary of State for Commonwealth Relations in dealing with British relationship with members of the Commonwealth of Nations (its former colonies). The position was created out of the old position of Under-Secretary of State for Dominion Affairs.

After 1966 the post was merged with the Under-Secretary of State for the Colonies and became the Under-Secretary of State for Commonwealth Affairs.

Office-Holders
1947: Arthur Bottomley
1947: Patrick Gordon Walker
1950: Lord Holden
1950: David Rees Williams
1951: Earl of Lucan
1951: John Foster
1954: Douglas Dodds-Parker
1955: Allan Noble
1956: Lord John Hope
1957: Cuthbert Alport
1959: Richard Thompson
1960: Duke of Devonshire (to 1962)
1961: Bernard Braine (to 1962)
1962: John Tilney (to 1964)
1964: Lord Taylor Also Under-Secretary of State for the Colonies 
1965: Lord Beswick Also Under-Secretary of State for the Colonies until 1 August 1966

Lists of government ministers of the United Kingdom
Defunct ministerial offices in the United Kingdom
1947 establishments in the United Kingdom
1966 disestablishments in the United Kingdom